Michael Vickers (born August 11, 1987) is a Canadian visual artist based in Toronto, Ontario who works primarily in sculpture, painting, and installation. He completed a master's degree in art history from the University of Toronto in 2013. Vickers is also co-director of the arts organization Akin, which provides affordable shared studio spaces for artists in Toronto, and professional and creative development opportunities through a range of programming initiatives.

Career 
Vickers has exhibited his work locally in Canada at Mercer Union, Division Gallery, the Art Gallery of Ontario, the Gardiner Museum, and Art Toronto and the Artist Project. His work has been shown internationally at Volta Basel, Clark House Mumbai and Dutch Design Week.

References

External links 
 Michael Vickers 
 Akin

1987 births
Living people
Artists from Toronto
Canadian installation artists
University of Toronto alumni
21st-century Canadian painters
21st-century Canadian sculptors
Canadian male sculptors
21st-century Canadian male artists